HMS Plymouth was a 60-gun fourth rate ship of the line of the Royal Navy, built at Devonport Dockyard (Devonport then known as Plymouth-Dock) to the 1706 Establishment of dimensions, and launched on 25 May 1708.

Orders were issued on 26 May 1720 directing Plymouth to be taken to pieces and rebuilt according to the 1719 Establishment at Chatham, from where she was relaunched on 2 August 1722. Plymouth remained in service until she was broken up in 1764.

Notes

References

Lavery, Brian (2003) The Ship of the Line - Volume 1: The development of the battlefleet 1650-1850. Conway Maritime Press. .

External links
 

Ships of the line of the Royal Navy
1700s ships